"When I Said I Do" is a song written by American country music singer Clint Black, and recorded by Black and his wife Lisa Hartman Black as a duet. It was released in August 1999 as the first single from Black's album D'lectrified. The song reached the top of the U.S. Billboard Hot Country Singles & Tracks chart and the Canadian RPM Country Tracks chart. It also peaked at number 31 on the U.S. Billboard Hot 100, making it a crossover hit. It is one of only two chart singles for Lisa Hartman Black. The song was later covered by then-husband and wife Kenny Lattimore and Chanté Moore on their album Things That Lovers Do.

Content
This song discusses the narrators' vow to stay together until the end of their lives.

Music video
The music video was directed by Clint Black himself and premiered in September 1999.

Chart performance
"When I Said I Do" debuted at number 45 on the U.S. Billboard Hot Country Singles & Tracks chart for the week of September 4, 1999. In December 1999, it became Clint's thirteenth and final number one single on that chart, and the only number one single for Lisa.

Year-end charts

Certifications

References

1999 singles
Clint Black songs
Lisa Hartman Black songs
Male–female vocal duets
Songs written by Clint Black
Song recordings produced by Clint Black
RCA Records Nashville singles
1999 songs